Spilomena is a genus of aphid wasps in the family  Crabronidae. The 86 species are found worldwide being represented in the Palearctic (highest number of species), Nearctic, Afrotropical, Neotropical, Australasian, and Indomalayan realms.

Species
These 88 species belong to the genus Spilomena:

 Spilomena acutitemporis Antropov, 1992 i c g
 Spilomena alboclypeata Bradley, 1906 i c g
 Spilomena alini Antropov, 1991 i c g
 Spilomena ampliceps Krombein, 1952 i c g
 Spilomena arania Leclercq, 1961 i c g
 Spilomena argentina Antropov, 1992 i c g
 Spilomena atrata Antropov, 1993 i c g
 Spilomena ausiana Leclercq, 1959 i c g
 Spilomena australis R. Turner, 1910 i c g
 Spilomena bakeri R. Bohart in Bohart and N. Smith, 1995 i c g
 Spilomena barberi Krombein, 1962 i c g
 Spilomena beata Blüthgen, 1953 i c g (Europe)
 Spilomena bicuspidata Antropov, 1993 i c g
 Spilomena bimaculata (Rayment, 1930) i c g
 Spilomena brasiliensis Antropov, 1991 i c g
 Spilomena canariensis Bischoff, 1937 i c g (Europe)
 Spilomena catamarca Antropov, 1992 i c g
 Spilomena chilensis Herbst, 1920 i c g
 Spilomena clypearis N. Smith in R. Bohart and N. Smith, 1995 i c g
 Spilomena clypei Li and He, 1998 i c g
 Spilomena curruca (Dahlbom, 1844) i c g (Europe)
 Spilomena dedzcli Tsuneki, 1971 i c g
 Spilomena differens Blüthgen, 1953 i c g (Europe)
 Spilomena djozankeiana Tsuneki, 1986 i c g
 Spilomena dyeri Antropov, 1993 i c g
 Spilomena earlyi Harris, 1994 i c g
 Spilomena elegantula R. Turner, 1916 i c g
 Spilomena elephantodeta Simon Thomas, 1995 i c g
 Spilomena emarginata Vardy, 1987 i c g
 Spilomena enslini Blüthgen, 1953 i c g (Europe)
 Spilomena formosana (Tsuneki, 1971) i c g
 Spilomena foxii Cresson, 1897 i c g
 Spilomena fresno N. Smith in R. Bohart and N. Smith, 1995 i c g
 Spilomena fulvicornis Gussakovskij, 1931 i c g
 Spilomena hainesi N. Smith in R. Bohart & N. Smith, 1995 i c g b
 Spilomena hobartia R. Turner, 1914 i c g
 Spilomena indostana R. Turner, 1918 i c g
 Spilomena iridescens R. Turner, 1916 i c g
 Spilomena jacobsoni Maidl, 1925 i c g
 Spilomena japonica Tsuneki, 1956 i c g
 Spilomena kaszabi Tsuneki, 1972 i c g
 Spilomena kelso R. Bohart in Bohart and N. Smith, 1995 i c g
 Spilomena kimseyae Antropov, 1993 i c g
 Spilomena koikensis Tsuneki, 1971 i c g
 Spilomena laeviceps Tsuneki, 1956 i c g
 Spilomena leucostigma R. Bohart in Bohart and N. Smith, 1995 i c g
 Spilomena longiceps R. Turner, 1916 i c g
 Spilomena longifrons (Rayment, 1930) i c g
 Spilomena luteiventris R. Turner, 1936 i c g
 Spilomena maghrebensis Dollfuss, 1983 i c g
 Spilomena menkei R. Bohart in Bohart and N. Smith, 1995 i c g
 Spilomena merceti Arnold, 1923 i c g
 Spilomena mocsaryi Kohl, 1898 i c g (Europe)
 Spilomena mongolica Tsuneki, 1972 i c g
 Spilomena montana R. Bohart in Bohart and N. Smith, 1995 i c g
 Spilomena nasuta Antropov, 1993 i c g
 Spilomena nigrifrons Simon Thomas, 1995 i c g
 Spilomena nozela Vardy, 1987 i c g
 Spilomena obliterata R. Turner, 1914 i c g
 Spilomena obscurior Gussakovskij, 1952 i c g
 Spilomena occidentalis R. Bohart in Bohart & N. Smith, 1995 i c g b
 Spilomena palawanensis Tsuneki, 1976 i c g
 Spilomena peruensis Dollfuss, 1982 i c g
 Spilomena pondola Leclercq, 1959 i c g
 Spilomena punctatissima Blüthgen, 1953 i c g (Europe)
 Spilomena pusilla (Say, 1837) i c g
 Spilomena quinteroi Antropov and Cambra, 2004 i c g
 Spilomena rhytithoracica Li and He, 1998 i c g
 Spilomena robusta Arnold, 1927 i c g
 Spilomena roshanica Gussakovskij, 1952 i c g
 Spilomena rossi Antropov, 1993 i c g
 Spilomena rudesculpta Gussakovskij, 1952 i c g
 Spilomena rufitarsus (Rayment, 1930) i c g
 Spilomena schlingeri Antropov, 1993 i c g
 Spilomena seyrigi Arnold, 1945 i c g
 Spilomena socialis Matthews in Turillazzi et al., 2014 i g
 Spilomena spinosa Antropov, 1993 i c g
 Spilomena stangei Antropov, 1992 i c g
 Spilomena stevensoni Arnold, 1924 i c g
 Spilomena subterranea McCorquodale and Naumann, 1988 i c g
 Spilomena troglodytes (Vander Linden, 1829) i c g (Europe)
 Spilomena tungurachua Antropov, 1993 i c g
 Spilomena turneri Arnold, 1927 i c g
 Spilomena vagans Blüthgen, 1953 g
 Spilomena valkeilai Vikberg, 2000 i c g (Europe)
 Spilomena willinki Antropov, 1992 i c g
 Spilomena wittei Leclercq, 1959 i c g
 Spilomena zhejiangana Li and He, 1998 i c g

Data sources: i = ITIS, c = Catalogue of Life, g = GBIF, b = Bugguide.net

References

External links
Spilomena images at  Consortium for the Barcode of Life
 Catalog of Sphecidae California Academy of Sciences Institute of Biodiversity

Hymenoptera of Europe
Crabronidae
Taxa named by William Edward Shuckard